HOV usually refers to a high-occupancy vehicle lane.

Hov or HOV may also refer to:

Companies
 Hovnanian Enterprises, an American real estate company
 HOV Services, an American outsourcing company

Places
 Hov, Faroe Islands, a village located on the island of Suðuroy in the Faroe Islands
 Hov, Norway, a village in Søndre Land municipality in Innlandet county, Norway
 Hov Church, a church in Sunndalsøra in Sunndal municipality, Møre og Romsdal county, Norway
 Hov or Hou, a village in Odder Municipality on the East coast of Jutland, Denmark

Transport
 Hove railway station, a railway station in Sussex, England (station code: HOV)
 Ørsta–Volda Airport, Hovden, an airport in Ørsta, Norway (airport code: HOV)

Other uses
 Hands Off Venezuela, a British lobby group
 Hovongan language, spoken in Indonesia
 Hov or hof, an old Germanic religious structure; see Heathen hofs
 Rapper Jay-Z (born Shawn Carter), whose nickname is HOV
 Hov 1, Swedish hip hop group